Tanja Milanović (born June 15, 1977) is a former handballer from Serbia, playing left back. She set her career in October 2010. Among the clubs she played for are ŽORK "Napredak" Kruševac, Madeira Andebol SAD, Randers HK, FC Midtjylland Håndbold, FCK Håndbold and FIF. She was the 2005/06 Danish league top scorer.

References
 Tanja Milanovic ended career
 About Tanja Malanovic on EHF's homepage

1977 births
Living people
Serbian female handball players